Shendi University is a public university that was established in 1994, located in Shendi, Sudan.
It is a member of the Federation of the Universities of the Islamic World.

References

Universities and colleges in Sudan
Educational institutions established in 1994
1994 establishments in Sudan